Wisdom Gidisu (born 5 May 1967) is a Ghanaian politician who is the member of parliament for Krachi East Constituency in the Oti Region of Ghana.

Early life and education 
Gidisu was born on 5 May 1967 in a town known as Adidome in Volta Region of Ghana. Gidisu graduated from Harvard University's John F. Kennedy School of Government with a BSc in Public Administration. He then returned to the same institution to earn his master's degree in Governance and Leadership. He also had his Executive MBA from GIMPA in 2012. He had his certificate in Executive Education, Managing Change in Dynamic World from Harvard Kennedy in the USA. He also had a certificate in Advance Health System Management in Israel.

Career 
He is a managing director of Top-in-Town enterprise in Dambai.

Political career 
Gidisu began his political career as a member of the parliament in January 2005 after winning the 2004 general elections with National Democratic Congress (NDC) ticket. He had a run of 3 terms in the office. He lost his seat to Micheal Gyato of the New Patriotic Party in the 2016 Ghanaian General Elections and he was aspiring for a comeback in 2020. He was a member and also the Vice Chairman of the Committee of Privileges, Health, House.

Personal life 
He is married with eight children. He is a Christian (Evangelical Presbyterian).

Philanthropy 
He constructed classroom blocks and provided water facilities as well as markets for communities in his constituency. He also facilitated rural electrification for some villages. He also distributed corn mils to serve 80 communities whiles a legislator in his community.

References 

People from Volta Region
1967 births
Living people
Harvard Kennedy School alumni
National Democratic Congress (Ghana) politicians
Ghanaian businesspeople
Ghanaian MPs 2005–2009
Ghanaian MPs 2009–2013
Ghanaian MPs 2013–2017
Ghanaian MPs 2021–2025